Lewis Girling Church (born 17 October 1928) is an English first-class cricketer.

A sailor by profession in the Royal Navy, Church played a single first-class cricket match for D. R. Jardine's XI against Oxford University at Eastbourne in 1957. Batting twice in the match, Church was dismissed for a single run by Jack Bailey in the D. R. Jardine's XI first-innings, while in their second-innings he was dismissed without scoring by Ian Gibson. He also bowled four wicket-less overs in the match with his leg break bowling.

References

External links

1928 births
Living people
People from Peterborough
Royal Navy sailors
English cricketers
D. R. Jardine's XI cricketers